Seamus Quinn is a former Gaelic footballer from Gortletteragh, County Leitrim. Along with Mickey Quinn he is Leitrim's only All Star winner. Quinn won an All Star at full-back in 1994. This was in Leitrim's Connacht Senior Football Championship winning season; Quinn would go on to become the last remaining member of that team following the departure of Fergal Reynolds.

In 2000, Brian McEniff selected him to represent Ireland against Australia, becoming the first Leitrim player to receive international recognition.

After retirement from playing he managed the county's junior team to a Connacht Junior Football Championship title in 2017.

Honours
 1 Connacht Senior Football Championship (1994)
 1 All Star Award (1994)
 1 International Rules Series (2000)

References

External links
 S Quinn at gaainfo.com
 Gortletteragh at gaainfo.com

Year of birth missing (living people)
Living people
Gaelic football backs
Gaelic football managers
Gortletteragh Gaelic footballers
Irish international rules football players
Leitrim inter-county Gaelic footballers
Sportspeople from County Leitrim